Epsilon Canis Minoris (ε Canis Minoris) is a suspected binary star system in the equatorial constellation of Canis Minor. It is a fifth magnitude star, which means it is bright enough to be faintly visible to the naked eye. Based upon an annual parallax shift of just 3.13 mas as seen from Earth, this star is located roughly 770 light years from the Sun, give or take a 40 light year margin of error. 

This is an evolved G-type bright giant star with a stellar classification of G6.5 IIb. It is most likely (99% chance) on the horizontal branch, and is a barium star that shows an abnormal overabundance of barium in its spectrum. This s-process element may have been accreted from a now white dwarf companion during a previous stage of its evolution. The bright giant component has an estimated 4.63 times the mass of the Sun and has expanded to 45.5 times the Sun's radius. The star is radiating 1,087 times the Sun's luminosity from its enlarged photosphere at an effective temperature of about 4,916 K.

References

G-type bright giants
Barium stars
Canis Minoris, Epsilon
Canis Minor
Durchmusterung objects
Canis Minoris, 02
058367
036041
2828